Shiriyanetta hasegawai is an extinct species of seaduck from the Pleistocene of Japan. It was flightless, similar to the also extinct Chendytes from the opposite side of the Pacific.

References

Merginae
Extinct flightless birds
Late Quaternary prehistoric birds
Extinct animals of Japan
Fossil taxa described in 2015